The Borghese Gladiators are a pair of statues outside Charlottenburg Palace in Berlin, Germany.

See also

 Borghese Gladiator, the classical sculpture in the Louvre

External links
 

Buildings and structures in Charlottenburg-Wilmersdorf
Nude sculptures in Germany
Outdoor sculptures in Berlin
Statues in Germany
Sculptures of men in Germany
Charlottenburg